Vladimir Zubkov (born January 14, 1958) is a Russian former professional ice hockey player who played in the Soviet Hockey League for HC Spartak Moscow and HC CSKA Moscow.  He was inducted into the Russian and Soviet Hockey Hall of Fame in 1983.

External links
 Russian and Soviet Hockey Hall of Fame bio

1958 births
Edmonton Oilers draft picks
Ice hockey people from Moscow
Soviet ice hockey defencemen
Living people
HC CSKA Moscow players
HC Spartak Moscow players
Chamonix HC players
Russian ice hockey defencemen
Soviet expatriate ice hockey players
Soviet expatriate sportspeople in France
Expatriate ice hockey players in France